An ovation is an ancient Roman military honor.

Ovation may also refer to:

 A standing ovation, a form of applause inspired by the Roman honor

In business and brands
 Ovation (software), a "vaporware" software package from the 1980s
 Ovation Guitar Company
 Ovation Records
 Mooney Ovation, a light aircraft
 Ovation, a distributed control system made by Emerson Process Management
 Ovation, a desktop publishing software application for the Acorn Archimedes
 MS Ovation of the Seas, a cruise ship

In media and entertainment
Ovation (Australian TV channel)
Ovation (American TV channel)
Ovation (award), a Russian music award
Ovation Awards, for excellence in theatre
The Ovation, a Thai pop band
The Ovations, an American vocal group